Jurruru is an extinct Australian Aboriginal language formerly spoken in the Pilbara region of Western Australia. Its name has also been spelt Chooraroo, Choororoo, Churoro, Djuroro, Djururo, Djurruru, Dyururu, Jururu, Thuraru, Tjororo, Tjuroro, Tjururo, and Tjururu.

Footnotes

References

Ngayarda languages
Extinct languages of Western Australia